Holloways Beach is a residential coastal suburb of Cairns, Queensland, Australia. II is located about 10 kilometres north of the city of Cairns between the suburbs of Machans Beach and Yorkeys Knob.

Holloways Beach is impacted by noise from Cairns International Airport, which keeps real estate prices in check. From February 2022 to January 2023 the median price for houses has been $540,000 and for units $259,000. However, waterfront properties come also here at a premium, with house well above the million dollar mark.

Journalist Chris Calcino from the local newspaper Cairns Post summed up his view about the suburb: "Not even the beach wants to live here. It continually tries to escape but gets cruelly sucked back in when Cairns Regional Council brings heavy machinery to dump new sand as part of its brutal anti-erosion agenda. Strait on the Beach does a fantastic fish burger and doesn't skimp on the ice cream in its iced coffees. Wear a mosquito coil around your neck because you will be mauled."

Geography 

The southeastern border with Machans Beach roughly follows Barr Creek, the opposite northwestern border with Yorkeys Knob is formed by Richter Creek. The southwestern border with the suburb of [{Barron, Queensland|Barron]] follows the Captain Cook Highway. Directly on the other side of the highway is a sand quarry. The northeastern border is formed by the beach from which the suburb derives its name. It is approximately 1.8 kilometres long. About midpoint on the beach there is a stinger-resistant swimming enclosure. Stingers, more formally known as box jellyfish, pose a danger in the first half of the calendar year.

The beach s subject to heavy erosion. Since ca. 2020 several million dollars have been invested to save the beach. This includes the creation of two 30-metre rock groynes. This has not helped a lot, therefore more money is spent to replace the sand ("sand nourishment").

In the east up to about 1300 metres inward from the beach the land-use is mostly residential while the west is predominantly farming land.

History 
Holloways Beach is situated in the traditional Djabugay (Tjapukai) Aboriginal country.

Richard Holloway came to Cairns in 1910 and was farming in the area in 1926. The area was officially named Holloway in 1951 by the Queensland Surveyor-General, renamed Holloway Beach in 1971 and then Holloways Beach in 1981. In 2002, the area was gazetted as a suburb of Cairns rather than as a rural locality.

Land was acquired in October 1951 for a school. However, in December 1951, a school bus service was established to take the students to Cairns Intermediate School and Cairns North State School. In October 1954, the Queensland Government allocated £2341 to relocate Woree's school buildings to Holloway's Beach and then repair and repaint the buildings. Holloway's Beach State School opened on 23 May 1955. It closed on 13 June 1966.

Education
School children now attend Machans Beach State School or other schools further away and Holloways Beach is in the catchment area for Cairns High School.

Holloways Beach Environmental Education Centre is at 46 Poinsettia Street.

Amenities

The beach has a lifeguard for much of the year.  There are a number of restaurants, including 2 coffee shops with one on the beach, a pizza shop and bottle shop. Other amenities include a convenience store, and a launderette.

Holloways Beach, Acacia Street is a boat ramp at South bank of Richters Creek 

There is a boat ramp into Richters Creek on the northern boundary of the suburb at Acacia Street. It is managed by the Cairns Regional Council. There are warning signs about crocodiles near the boat ramp.

The Holloways Beach SES Group meets at the Syd and Jane Granville Memorial Park in Cassia Street.

References

External links

 

Suburbs of Cairns
Beaches of Queensland